A V8 engine is an eight-cylinder piston engine in which two banks of four cylinders share a common crankshaft and are arranged in a V configuration.

The first V8 engine was produced by the French Antoinette company in 1904, developed and used in cars and speedboats but primarily aircraft; while the American 1914–1935 Cadillac L-Head engine is considered the first road-going V8 engine to be mass produced in significant quantities. The popularity of V8 engines in cars was greatly increased following the 1932 introduction of the Ford Flathead V8.

In the early 21st century, the use of V8 engines in passenger vehicles declined as automobile manufacturers opted for more fuel efficient, lower capacity engines, or hybrid and electric drivetrains.

Design

V-angle 

The majority of V8 engines use a V-angle (the angle between the two banks of cylinders) of 90 degrees. This angle results in good engine balance, which results in low vibrations; however, the downside is a larger width than V8 engines that use a smaller V-angle.

V8 engines with a 60-degree V-angle were used in the 1996–1999 Ford Taurus SHO, the 2005–2011 Volvo XC90, and the 2006–2009 Volvo S80. The Ford engine used a 60-degree V-angle because it was based on a V6 engine with a 60-degree V-angle. Both the Ford and Volvo engines were used in transverse engine chassis, which were designed for a front-wheel-drive layout (with an on-demand all-wheel drive system in the case of the Volvos). To reduce the vibrations caused by the unbalanced 60-degree V-angle, the Volvo engines used a balance shaft and offset split crankpins. The Rolls-Royce Meteorite tank engine also used a 60-degree V-angle, since it was derived from the 60 degree V12 Rolls-Royce Meteor which in turn was based on the famous Rolls-Royce Merlin V12 engine.

Other V-angles have been used occasionally. The Lancia Trikappa, Lancia Dilambda, and Lancia Astura, produced 1922–1939, used narrow angle V8 engines (based on the Lancia V4 engine) with V-angles of 14—24 degrees. The 1932 Miller four-wheel drive racing cars used a V8 engine with a V-angle of 45 degrees. The 8-cylinder versions of the 1945–1966 EMD 567 diesel locomotive engine also used a V-angle of 45 degrees.

Crankshaft configuration

Cross-plane crankshaft 
Most V8 engines fitted to road cars use a cross-plane crankshaft, since this configuration produces less vibration due to the perfect primary balance and secondary balance. The cross-plane crankshaft has the four crank pins (numbered from the front) at angles of 0, 90, 180, and 270 degrees, which results in a cross shape for the crankshaft when it is viewed from one end.

The iconic rumbling exhaust sound produced by a typical cross-plane V8 engine is partly due to the uneven firing order within each of the two banks of four cylinders. A typical firing order of L-R-L-L-R-L-R-R (or R-L-R-R-L-R-L-L) results in uneven intake and exhaust pulse spacing for each bank. When separate exhaust systems are used for each bank of cylinders, this uneven pulsing results in the rumbling sound that is typically associated with V8 engines. However, racing engines seek to avoid these uneven exhaust pressure pulses, to maximize the power output. The 1960s cross-plane V8 racing engines used long primary exhaust pipes (such as the Ford GT40 endurance racing car) or located the exhaust ports on the inside of the V-angle (such as the Lotus 38 IndyCar) to link the exhaust systems from each bank and provide even exhaust gas pulses),.

Flat-plane crankshaft 
On the other hand, a flat-plane crankshaft is used by many V8 engines fitted to racing cars.

This configuration provides two benefits. Mechanically, the crankshaft can be machined from a flat billet and does not require counterweights so it is lighter. However, it produces more vibration due to a secondary imbalance.

From the gas dynamics aspect, the flat-plane crankshaft allows for even exhaust gas pulses to be achieved with a simple exhaust system. The design was popularized in motor racing by the 1961–1965 Coventry Climax FWMV Formula One engine, and the 1967–1985 Cosworth DFV engine was highly successful in Formula One. Several production sports cars have used flat-plane V8 engines, such as every Ferrari V8 model (from the 1973 Ferrari 308 GT4 to the 2019-present Ferrari F8 Tributo), the Lotus Esprit V8, the Porsche 918 Spyder, and the McLaren MP4-12C.

Most early V8 road car engines also used a flat-plane crankshaft, since this was simpler to design and build than a cross-plane crankshaft. Early flat-plane V8 engines included the 1910 De Dion-Bouton engine, the 1915 Peerless engine, and the 1915 Cadillac engine.

Origins 

The first known V8 engine was the Antoinette engine, designed by Léon Levavasseur, which was first built in 1904. The Antoinette was built in France for use in speedboat racing and, later, airplanes. Also in 1904, V8 engines began small-scale production by Renault and Buchet for use in race cars.

In 1905, the first V8 engine used in a road-going car was the Rolls-Royce V-8 built in the United Kingdom. This model was initially produced with a  V8 engine, however only three cars were produced before Rolls-Royce reverted to using straight-six engines. In 1907, the Hewitt Touring Car became the first car built in the United States with a V8 engine. The 1910 De Dion-Bouton— built in France— is considered to be the first V8 engine produced in significant quantities.

The 1914 Cadillac L-head V8 engine is considered to be the first mass-production V8 engine. This engine was built in the United States and was greatly assisted by Cadillac's pioneering use of electric starter motors.

Early airplanes continued to use V8 engines, such as the 1915 Hispano-Suiza 8 SOHC engine designed in Switzerland. This engine was used by American, French, and British military aircraft in World War One. It is estimated that approximately half of all Allied aircraft were powered by the Hispano-Suiza 8 engine.

Automobile use
The V8 engine with a cross-plane crankshaft is a common configuration for large automobile engines.

Due to its large external dimensions, V8 engines are typically used in cars that use a longitudinal engine layout and rear-wheel drive (or all-wheel drive). However, V8 engines have also occasionally been used in transverse engine front-wheel drive vehicles, sometimes using closer cylinder bore spacings and narrower cylinder bank angles to reduce their space requirements.

Australia 

The first Australian-designed car to use a V8 engine was the 1965 Chrysler Valiant (AP6), which was available with an American-built  Chrysler engine. The first locally designed V8 Ford was the 1966 Ford Falcon (XR) and the first V8 Holden was the 1968 Holden HK, both using engines supplied by their parent companies in the United States.

The first V8 engine to be mass-produced in Australia was the 1969–2000 Holden V8 engine. The Holden V8 engine was used in various models including the Kingswood, Monaro, Torana, Commodore, and Statesman. The Holden V8 engine was also used in touring car racing and formed the basis of the Repco-Holden engine used in Formula 5000 racing. In 1999, the Holden V8 engine began to be replaced by the imported General Motors LS1 V8 engine.

In 1971, Ford Australia began local production of the Ford 'Cleveland' V8, an overhead valve cast-iron engine. It was also used in several low-volume DeTomaso sports cars and luxury sedans built in Italy. Australian production ceased in 1982 when Ford Australia temporarily ceased production of V8 cars. From 1991 to 2016, the Ford Falcon was available with the imported Ford Windsor, Ford Barra or Ford Modular V8 engines; the latter were marketed as "Boss" and locally assembled from a mix of imported and local parts.

A  version of the Rover V8 engine was produced in Australia for the ill-fated 1973–1975 Leyland P76 sedan. The engine was an overhead valve design and the only all-aluminium engine produced in Australia.

China 
The 1958–1965 Hongqi CA72 was a luxury car, of which approximately 200 were built for government officials. It was powered by a  Chrysler LA engine and built on the chassis of a 1950s Chrysler Imperial.

Czech Republic 

The 1934–1938 Tatra 77 rear-engined sedan was initially powered by  petrol V8, which was air-cooled and used an overhead camshaft that operated the valves using a 'walking beam' rocker arrangement. This model line continued until 1999 when the Tatra 700 ended production.

Tatra also produced diesel V8 truck engines from the 1939 Tatra 81 to the present day Tatra 815.

France 
French manufacturers were pioneering in their use of V8 engines in the early 1900s with the 1904 Antoinette aircraft engine (the first known V8 engine) and the 1910 De Dion-Bouton. However, there were few French automotive V8 engines in the following decades, with manufacturers such as Delage, Delahaye, Talbot-Lago, Bugatti, and Hotchkiss instead using six-cylinder or straight-eight engines.

From 1935 to 1954, Matford (Ford's French subsidiary, later renamed to 'Ford SAF') produced cars with V8 engines, closely based on contemporary American Ford models. Simca purchased the Ford SAF in 1954 and continued to produce various models powered by the Ford Flathead V8 until 1969.

After WW2, France imposed very steep tax horsepower charges - the owners of cars with engines above 2 L were financially penalized, so France had a very small domestic market for larger-engined cars, such as the V8. Despite this, Facel Vega produced luxury and sports cars powered by Chrysler V8 engines from 1954 to 1964.

Germany 

One of the first German V8 engines was the 1928–1945 Argus As 10 aircraft engine. This engine was air-cooled, used an 'inverted V' design, and was used in several training, reconnaissance, and communications airplanes.

From 1933 to 1940, the Horch 830 luxury cars were powered by V8 engines (sold alongside Horch's larger straight-eight engines). Shortly after, the 1934–1937 Stoewer Greif V8 was powered by a  V8 engine.

BMW's first V8 engine was the 1954–1965 BMW OHV V8 engine, a petrol engine with overhead valves and all-aluminium construction. The company resumed production of V8 engines in 1992 with the BMW M60 aluminium double overhead camshaft engine, and V8 engines have remained in production until the present day. BMW's first turbocharged V8 engine was the 1998-2009 M67 twin-turbocharged diesel engine. The first turbocharged V8 petrol engine from BMW was the 2008–present BMW N63 engine.

Their first eight-cylinder engine since passenger car and motorsport straight-eight engine production stopped in 1944 and 1955 respectively, Mercedes-Benz began production of the Mercedes-Benz M100 petrol V8 engine in 1963 and has continued production of V8 engines to the present day. The M100 had a single overhead camshaft, a cast-iron block, and an aluminium head. Supercharging was first used on the Mercedes-Benz M113 engine in 2002 and turbocharging was first used on non-commercial diesel V8 engines in 1999 with the OM628 and on petrol engines with the M278 engine in 2010.

Porsche's first road car to use a V8 engine was the 1978 Porsche 928 coupe. Its first to use a V8 diesel engine was the second-generation Cayenne S Diesel in 2014.

Audi's first road car to use a V8 engine was the 1988 Audi V8 luxury sedan. Its first model to use a V8 diesel engine was the D2 A8 3.3 TDI in 2000.

Italy 
 
The first V8-engined Alfa Romeo road car was the 1967–1969 Alfa Romeo 33 Stradale mid-engined sports car, of which 18 cars were produced. This was followed by the 1970–1977 Alfa Romeo Montreal front-engined sports car. The engines for both cars are based on the 90-degree V8 engine from the Alfa Romeo Tipo 33 racing car, and have double overhead camshafts and a dry sump.

The 2007–2010 Alfa Romeo 8C Competizione / Spider sports cars are powered by a  version of the Ferrari F136 engine with a cross-plane crankshaft.

 

Ferrari's first contact with V8 engines was the Vittorio Jano-designed 1955 Lancia-Ferrari D50, a Formula One racing car that the company acquired as part of its purchase of Lancia's Formula One racing department. The first Ferrari-developed V8 engines were used in the 1962 Ferrari 248 SP and Ferrari 268 SP sports prototype racing cars, designed by Carlo Chiti. This engine had a single overhead camshaft and was rear-mounted in the cars.

The company's first V8 road car was the 1973–1974 Dino 308 GT4 mid-engined sports car. The engine is a 90-degree all-aluminium V8 with double overhead camshafts. In 1975, the  engine in the Ferrari 208 GT4 became the smallest production V8 engine ever produced. The model lineage of mid-engined V8 road cars continues to the 2019–present Ferrari F8 Tributo.

Five-valve-per-cylinder versions were used 1994–2005 in the Ferrari F355 and Ferrari 360. Turbocharging was introduced on the 1984–1987 Ferrari 288 GTO flagship car and the range of entry-level mid-engined sports cars switched to turbocharging with the 2015 Ferrari 488.

The Formula One team resumed usage of V8 engines for the 2006–2013 seasons, beginning with the Ferrari 248 F1.

 

The first Maserati V8 road car was the 1959–1965 Maserati 5000 GT luxury coupe, of which only 34 cars were produced. The 5000 GT used a  overhead camshaft engine derived from the Maserati 450S racing car. Developments of this engine were used in the 1963–1969 Maserati Quattroporte I luxury sedan, the 1967–1973 Maserati Ghibli, the 1971–1978 Maserati Bora 2-seat coupe, and several other models.

The 1990–1996 Maserati Shamal 2+2 coupe introduced a  turbocharged V8 engine based on the existing Maserati Biturbo V6. This engine was later replaced by the naturally aspirated  Ferrari F136 V8 engine, beginning with the 2001 Maserati Coupé / Spyder.

 
During the 1920s and 1930s, Lancia produced a line of range-topping luxury cars powered by V8 engines: the 1922–1925 Lancia Trikappa, the 1928–1935 Lancia Dilambda, and the 1931–1939 Lancia Astura. In the 1980s, an engine derived from Ferrari's V8 engine was transverse-mounted in the Lancia Thema 8.32.

The only Fiat car to use a V8 engine was the Fiat 8V, of which approximately 100 were produced 1952–1954. The  pushrod engine used an all-aluminium construction and an unusual V-angle of 70 degrees. Fiat also began production of V8 diesel truck engines for the 1975 Des-8280, initially in the naturally aspirated form before switching to turbocharging in the mid-1980s.

Lamborghini's V8 powered models are the 1972–1979 Lamborghini Urraco 2+2 coupe, 1976–1979 Lamborghini Silhouette 2-seat convertible, and 1981–1988 Lamborghini Jalpa 2-seat convertible. The 2018–present Lamborghini Urus SUV uses a Volkswagen Group turbocharged V8 engine.

Japan 

Japanese manufacturers have not been large producers of V8 engines for passenger cars, due to Japanese government road tax regulations that impose higher charges for engines that exceed . However several passenger cars have been produced with V8 engines to meet the needs of consumers, as well as for use in motor racing.

 
Honda has never produced V8 engines for passenger vehicles. In the late 1990s, the company resisted considerable pressure from its American dealers for a V8 engine with American Honda reportedly sending one dealer a shipment of "V8" vegetable juice to silence them. The only Honda car sold with a V8 engine was the 1993–1998 Honda Crossroad SUV, which was a rebadged Land Rover Discovery Series I fitted with the Rover V8 engine.

In motor racing, the Honda Indy V8 was produced for the 2003–2011 IndyCar racing series and was the control engine for the 2006–2011 seasons. The engine was a  all-aluminium V8 with double-overhead camshafts, with a power output of 650-700 hp, and a 10,300 rpm redline.

 
From 1999 to 2000, Mitsubishi briefly sold the Mitsubishi 8A8 engine, which was a  all-aluminium V8 engine with double overhead camshafts and direct injection. The engine was fitted to the Mitsubishi Proudia luxury sedan and Mitsubishi Dignity limousine, however, financial pressures forced the company to discontinue sales of both these vehicles after only fifteen months.

 
Its main use was in the Nissan President limousine. This was replaced by the Nissan VK engine in 2002, which remains in production to the present day.

 
The first mass-produced Japanese V8 engine was the Toyota V engine, which was introduced in the 1964 Toyota Crown Eight luxury car. The Toyota V engine was an all-aluminium construction, used a pushrod valvetrain, and was produced until 1997. The Toyota UZ engine has double overhead camshafts and was produced 1989–2013, while the Toyota UR engine added direct injection and has been in production since 2006.

From 2006 to 2009, the Toyota Racing Formula One team cars were powered by  naturally-aspirated V8 engines, as mandated by the Formula One rules. These Toyota engines were rated to produce  at 19,000 rpm ( at 18,000 rpm for 2009), and were also used by the Williams, Midland, and Jordan teams.

Korea 
Hyundai's first passenger car V8 engine was the 1999–2009 Hyundai Omega engine, which was based on the Mitsubishi 8A8 engine (see above). The Omega engine was replaced by the Hyundai Tau engine, which is an all-aluminium construction with double overhead camshafts and has been produced from 2008–present.

Sweden 
Volvo developed the B36 V8 engine in 1952 intended to be used in the planned Volvo Philip car. The project was canceled, but the engine was used in trucks from 1956.

Koenigsegg initially used twin-supercharged versions of the Ford Modular V8 engine in its 2002–2004 Koenigsegg CC8S and 2004–2006 Koenigsegg CCR. The company switched to its own twin-supercharged engine for the 2006–2010 Koenigsegg CCX. A twin-turbocharged V8 engine was introduced in the 2011 Koenigsegg Agera and has been used on all models since.

Soviet Union and Russian Federation 

The 1958–1967 ZIL-111 limousine was among the first Soviet cars to be powered by a V8 engine. The engine was an all-aluminium construction with a pushrod valvetrain. Production of ZIL limousines powered by V8 engines continued until the ZIL-41047 was discontinued in 2002.

The 1959–1988 GAZ Chaika was powered by a  V8 engine with an all-aluminium construction and a pushrod valvetrain. This engine was also used in several limited-edition models for the KGB.

Also, diesel engines of the V8 configuration are produced by the Yaroslavl Motor Plant, KamAZ . Sollers produces gasoline engines for Aurus cars .

United Kingdom 
 
The 1969–1972 Aston Martin DBS V8 coupe/convertible was Aston Martin's first V8 model. This engine was an all-aluminium construction with double overhead camshafts and was used in several models up until 2000 when the Virage model was discontinued.

Production of V8-engined Aston Martin cars resumed in 2005 with a new generation of the Vantage, powered by the Jaguar AJ-V8 naturally aspirated V8 engine. Since 2016, Aston Martin has switched to the Mercedes-Benz M177 turbocharged V8 engine, beginning with the DB11 model.

 
Every McLaren road car since the brand's 2010 relaunch has been powered by the McLaren M838T twin-turbocharged V8 engine, which was introduced in the McLaren 12C (then called the 'MP4-12C') coupe. This engine is an all-aluminium construction with double overhead camshafts and a flat-plane crankshaft.

 

The first V8 engine to be produced in the United Kingdom was fitted to the 1905 Rolls-Royce V-8, of which 3 cars were produced.

Mass-production of V8 engines began in 1959 with the release of the Rolls-Royce–Bentley L-series V8 engine in the Rolls-Royce Silver Cloud II, the Rolls-Royce Phantom IV, and the Bentley S2. This engine is an all-aluminium construction with a pushrod valvetrain and a V-angle of 90 degrees. The L-series V8 engine remains in production in the Bentley Mulsanne luxury sedan.

 
Rover began production of automotive V8 engines in 1967 with the Rover V8 engine. This engine used the design and tooling of the Buick V8 engine purchased from General Motors. It was used in various automobiles by Rover, Land Rover, and MG.

Production continued until 2006 when it was largely replaced by the Jaguar AJ-V8 engine.

 
The Daimler V8 engine was introduced in the 1959 Daimler SP250 sports car and was produced until 1969.

The Jaguar AJ-V8 engine— Jaguar's first V8 engine for road cars— has been in production since 1996. This engine is an all-aluminium construction with double overhead camshafts. It has been produced in both naturally aspirated and supercharged configurations.

Land Rover and Range Rover produced vehicles fitted with the Rover V8 naturally aspirated petrol engine 1970–2004, the Ford TDV8 turbocharged diesel engine 2007–2012, the BMW M62 naturally aspirated petrol engine 2002–2006 and N63 twin-turbo petrol V8 from 2022, the Jaguar AJ-V8 from petrol engine (in both naturally aspirated and supercharged configurations) from 2006–present and the Ford 4.4 Turbo Diesel engine from 2010–present.

The 1970–1977 Triumph V8 was used solely for the Triumph Stag coupe.

The 1996–2003 TVR Speed Eight engine was used in the Cerbera road cars and the Tuscan Challenge racing cars. This engine had an all-aluminium construction, single overhead camshafts, a flat-plane crankshaft, and an unusual V-angle of 75 degrees.

United States 

The first automotive V8 engine to reach production was the 1914–1935 Cadillac L-Head engine introduced in the Type 51. An electric starter motor was used, eliminating the large engines being difficult to start with hand-cranking. The Cadillac engine was followed by a V8 model from Peerless (using an engine manufactured by an amusement park manufacturer) in 1915.

Production of the Series D models ceased in 1918.

The 1924 Cadillac Type V-63 was powered by the first American V8 to use a cross-plane crankshaft, which reduced vibrations. A year later, Peerless also introduced a cross-plane crankshaft V8. Other manufacturers producing V8 engines by the mid-1920s included Lincoln, Ferro, Northway (supplier to Cadillac), Cole (Indianapolis and Mississippi), Perkins (Detroit), Murray, Vernon, and Yale.

A significant development in providing V8 engines in more affordable cars was the 1932 through 1954 Ford Flathead V8. The Flathead V8 reduced production costs by using a monobloc (or "en block") construction, where each cylinder bank is made from a single piece of cast metal. The engine was fitted to the low-cost Ford Model 18 car, offering superior performance to its competitors.

Demand for larger cars increased in the years following World War II and the wider bodies were well suited to the fitment of V8 engines. This led to many manufacturers introducing overhead valve V8 engines, such as the 1949–1964 Oldsmobile Rocket engine, the 1949–1962 Cadillac 331 engine, the 1951–1958 Chrysler Firepower engine, the Studebaker's 1952 V8 engine, the 1953–1966 Buick Nailhead engine, the 1954–2002 Chevrolet small-block engine, the 1954–1963 Lincoln Y-block V8 engine, the 1955–1981 Pontiac V8 engine, and the 1956–1967 AMC Rambler engine.

Engine displacements grew in conjunction with the expanding size of full-size cars through the 1950s to mid-1970s. This led to 'big block' engines such as:
  Ford FE engine released in 1956
  Lincoln Y-block engine released in 1956
  Pontiac Super Duty engine released in 1961
  Chrysler Hemi engine released in 1965
  Chevrolet big-block engine released in 1970. 
The classification of 'big-block' or 'small-block' refers to the engine's external dimensions and is not necessarily indicative of the actual engine displacement. Engines with displacements between  have been classified as both small-block and big-block, depending on the particular manufacturer's range of engines. Big-block engines reached their zenith with the  Cadillac 500 engine used in the 1970 Cadillac Eldorado coupe. During the 1970s, due to the oil crises and the gradual tightening of emission standards, big-block V8s were affected and as a result, their use in passenger cars decreased as manufacturers began to phase them out for more efficient designs.

Prior to the late 1970s, sharing of engines across General Motors' divisions was not commonplace. This enabled each division to have its own unique engine character but made for much duplication of effort. The company has since implemented sharing of engines across divisions, however, some divisions (such as Cadillac) still maintain some engines specific to their division. Ford and Chrysler had fewer divisions and favored brand-specific shared designs.

In 2011 GM built its 100-millionth unit of the Chevrolet small-block engine, making that engine family the most produced V8 engine in the world.

American manufacturers continue to produce large displacement V8 engines, despite the strategy of downsizing engines (often in conjunction with turbocharging) being adopted by many European and Asian manufacturers. These engines continued to use pushrod (overhead valve) valvetrains long after most overseas engines had switched to dual overhead camshaft designs. Examples include the  Chrysler Apache engine produced from 2011–present, the  Ford Godzilla engine produced from 2020–present, and the  Chevrolet L8T engine produced from 2020–present.

Cadillac's Cadillac LTA engine codenamed "Blackwing" developed, hand-built, and exclusively used by Cadillac on its mid-range vehicles sporty sedans and coupes employs a turbocharged  configuration with a double overhead camshaft valve train, marking the first time in the brand's 100-plus-year history that a twin-turbocharged V8 unit is used.

Vietnam 
In Vietnam, VinFast used a V8 engine in the full-size SUV VinFast President from December 2020.

Motorsport 

V8 engines have been used in many forms of motorsport, from Formula One, IndyCar and NASCAR circuit racing, to Top Fuel drag racing.

 
Among the first V8 Formula One cars to compete were the 1952 AFM entry and the 1954 Lancia D50, with a development of the latter powering Juan Manuel Fangio's 1956 car to victory in the driver's championship. The 1.5 L Formula One era of 1961–1965 included V8 engines from Ferrari, Coventry Climax, British Racing Motors (BRM), and Automobili Turismo e Sport (ATS). The driver's championships for the 1962, 1963, 1964, and 1965 seasons were won by drivers of V8-powered cars. Also, from 1962 to 1965, the top three manufacturers in each season's Constructor's Championship all predominantly used V8 engines in their cars. In 1966, the engine capacity limits were increased to 3.0 litres (or 1.5 litres with a supercharger), and 1966–1967 Constructor's Championships were won by cars powered by the Brabham-Repco V8 engine.

From 1968 to 1981, the Cosworth DFV V8 engine dominated Formula One racing. During this time, the Manufacturers' Championship was won by Cosworth DFV-powered cars every season except 1975, 1976, 1977, and 1979, which were won by 12-cylinder Ferraris. After a very long period of dominance, the Cosworth DFV was eventually outpaced by turbocharged straight-four and V6 engines.

The next period of significant V8 usage in Formula One was from 2006 to 2013, when the rules mandated use of  naturally-aspirated V8 engines, with regular power outputs between 730 and 810 hp (in order to reduce the power outputs being achieved by the previous 3.0 litre V10 engines). These were replaced by 1.6 litre turbocharged V6 engines for the 2014–present seasons.

 
American premier stock car racing NASCAR series has been dominated by V8 engines since its inaugural 1949 season.

 
The engines used in Top Fuel and Funny car drag racing are typically based on the aluminum-conversion Chrysler 426 Hemi engine and run on highly explosive nitromethane fuel.

 
The world's fastest non-jet-powered (i.e. piston-engine powered) wheeled land vehicle, the Speed Demon, which achieved a speed of 462.345 mph in 2017, is powered by a V8 engine based on the Chevrolet small-block engine design.

Airplane use

Several early aircraft engines used a V8 configuration, such as the French 1904 Antoinette engine and 1906 Buchet engines. During World War One, V8 aircraft engines included the French Renault 8G, the Spanish Hispano-Suiza 8, the British Sunbeam Arab, and the American Curtiss OX-5.

After this time, flat-eight engines became more commonplace than V8 engines due to their lighter crankshafts and better suitability to air cooling. One of the few remaining V8 airplane engines by World War Two was the German Argus As 10 inverted V8, which was air-cooled and used in several trainers as well as small utility aircraft.

Marine vessel use

The V8 configuration is not commonly used in marine vessels, however, several marine diesel V8 engines have been produced by companies such as Brons, Scania, and Yanmar.

Gray Marine Motor Company was one of the first to use V8 engines for marine use.

Engines from American Motors Corporation (AMC) were used from 1957 to 1968. They were marketed as "Fireball" inboards and available in  versions using a variety of carburetor combinations including single and dual Carter one barrel YH side-drafts, Carter two-barrel, and Carter AFB/AVS four-barrel types. The engine is mostly the same as for automobile applications, with changes to freeze plugs and cam profiles (to reduce top rpm) but often has a reverse rotation for use in twin-engine boats.

Wärtsilä 31, a four-stroke medium-speed diesel engine manufactured by Wärtsilä, is one of the few large marine diesel engines available in V8 configuration.

Motorcycle use
Until Boss Hoss Cycles began production in 1990, the few V8 motorcycles made were either prototypes or racing machines.

The Moto Guzzi V8 was a  motorcycle capable of  used for Grand Prix racing from 1955 to 1957. The 1994 Morbidelli V8 was a  concept motorcycle which did not reach production. , Boss Hoss had sold over 4,000 bikes and trikes with Chevrolet V8 car engines.

See also 
 Flat-eight engine
 Straight-eight engine
 W8 engine

References 

 
8